Quilchena Airport  was located near Quilchena, British Columbia, Canada.

A short gravel runway is located beside Highway 5A at Quilchena, BC. The Quilchena General Store is located at the south end of the runway.

References

Defunct airports in British Columbia
Thompson-Nicola Regional District